The 2017 season was Bohemian F.C.'s 127th year in existence as a football club. The club participated in the League of Ireland Premier Division, the FAI Cup, the EA Sports Cup.

Club

Kits
Tailored by Hummel, the new shirt features the club's traditional red and black stripes, a new round collar, and the back of the jersey featured the famous club sign from Dalymount Lane.

Supplier: Hummel / Sponsor: Mr Green

Management team

Squad

Competitions

Premier Division

League table

Results summary

Results by matchday

Matches

References

Bohemian F.C. seasons
Bohemian F.C. season